Swamp Creatures is a play by the Australian author Alan Seymour. He wrote it for radio, stage and TV. It was Seymour's first produced play.

Plot
Two sisters live together in the Australian bush, the dominant Constance and the frail Amy. Amy's son Christian returns after having disappeared when he was in his teens. For Constance, the swamp is a symbol of life. For Amy it is a nightmare.

It turns out genetic experiments were made by a driven woman and her handyman, Charlie Fall.

Background
The play was written in 1955–56. In 1956 it was the runner-up in a play competition held by the Journalists' Club and judged by the Playwrights' Advisory Board. In 1957 it was one of the twenty-five finalists in the play competition held by the London Observer.

It was first performed by the Canberra Repertory Society in 1957.

Cast of original production
Joyce Goodes as Constance
Barbara Shanahan as Amy
Michael Dennis as Christian
Harry Schmidt as Mr Fall
Daphne Curtis as Mrs Fall

Background
The play was based on a true story about an old woman who lived near a swamp and disappeared.

1960 TV adaptation

The play was filmed for TV by the ABC in 1960.

The play was repeated on TV in 1962.

Cast
Jacqueline Kott as Caroline
Lynne Murphy as Amy
Graham Hill as Christian
Marion Johns as Mrs Fall
Frank Walters as Mr Fall

Production
In September 1959 it was announced that the ABC had created a TV Writers Pool, with the aim of teaching local writers the techniques of learning for the screen. There were ten initial members: Alan Seymour, Jeff Underhill, Richard Lane, Barbara Vernon, D'arcy Niland and Ruth Park, Gwen Meredith, Kay Keaveny, Peter Kenna and Coral Lansbury.

Early Australian TV drama production was dominated by using imported scripts but in 1960 the ABC was undertaking what has been described as "an Australiana drive" of producing local stories.  Swamp Creatures was one in a series of ten plays made by the ABC in 1960 using local writers, others including The Astronauts and The Slaughter of St Teresa's Day

Floor assistant David Twiby recalled that during the making of Swamp Creatures, the smoke machine caused a stage hand to nearly die during the broadcast.

Reception
The Sunday Sydney Morning Herald TV critic called it "one of the finest drama efforts I have seen done here. Both from a technical and acting point of view, it couldn't be faulted... it gripped the interest from the first sequence. A scene where the two demented sisters stage a dream party in the near empty house was a brilliant piece of work."

Another Herald critic said the production "was at least successful in showing how a handful of characters can be marshalled to produce gripping theatre" but thought "the central issues are somewhat cloudily expressed. It is as if Seymour, having bunched these characters in a relatively surreal situation, is content to pile shock on shock at the expense of fully developing the main thread: that humanism rather than science is the answer"

Other adaptation
The play was adapted for radio by the ABC in 1958.

The play was intended to be adapted as a feature film by Kevin Powell and Anthony Buckley Productions but no film resulted.

See also
List of television plays broadcast on Australian Broadcasting Corporation (1960s)

References

External links

1950s Australian plays
1960 television plays
1957 plays
1960s Australian television plays